was a town located in Jinseki District, Hiroshima Prefecture, Japan.

As of 2003, the town had an estimated population of 3,089 and a density of 31.51 persons per km². The total area was 98.02 km².

On November 5, 2004, Yuki, along with the towns of Jinseki and Sanwa, and the village of Toyomatsu (all from Jinseki District), was merged to create the town of Jinsekikōgen.

Yuki was well known for notably sake and miso of the Shinrai and Shinryu establishments.

External links
 Official website of Jinsekikogen 

Dissolved municipalities of Hiroshima Prefecture